Love Songs is the first love songs compilation released on January 29, 2008 by country music singer Billy Ray Cyrus. The album was released on Mercury Nashville, Cyrus' first album with the label since leaving in 1998. 

The album features love songs from Cyrus' studio albums he recorded with Mercury Records. Several of the tracks, however, were not radio singles, but album cuts. The track "Only God (Could Stop Me Loving You)" has been covered by several artists, including Emerson Drive. Their version of the song reached number 23 on the Hot Country Singles & Tracks chart in 2003. Also, the song "Somebody New" was covered by Jill King in 2008, her version of the song failed to chart.

Reception

Thom Jurek of allmusic gave the album 2.5 stars out of 5. He said "Isn't it awesome to have a Billy Ray Cyrus compilation without "Achy Breaky Heart" on it? Yes, and no. Yes, because some listeners need to hear that song again and again as long as they live, and no, because this collection of love songs doesn't really do much for the reborn Cyrus' reputation as a singer." However, he did go on to say that "She's Not Cryin' Anymore" was the best song originally on Some Gave All. He then went on and said that "Only God (Could Stop Me Loving You)" and "Missing You" were "flat and lifeless".

Track listing

Chart performance
The album debuted and peaked at number 63 on Billboard's Top Country Albums chart, becoming Cyrus' lowest charting album on the chart.

References

Billy Ray Cyrus albums
2008 compilation albums
Mercury Records compilation albums